The Aden Expedition was a naval operation that the British Royal Navy carried out in January 1839. Following Britain's decision to acquire the port of Aden as a coaling station for the steamers sailing the new Suez-Bombay route, the sultan of Lahej, who owned Aden, resisted, which led to a series of skirmishes between the two sides. In response to the incidents, a small force of warships and soldiers of the East India Company were sent to Arabia. The expedition succeeded in defeating the Arab defenders, who held the fortress on Sira Island, and occupied the nearby port of Aden.

Order of battle
Royal Navy:
, frigate (28 guns)
, sloop (18 guns)
 brig (18 guns)
, schooner (5 guns)

References

Bibliography

See also
Punitive expedition
Nukapu Expedition
Johanna Expedition

Conflicts in 1839
19th century in Yemen
Aden
Aden
Punitive expeditions of the United Kingdom
United Kingdom–Yemen relations
1839 in Asia
January 1839 events